Maria Lea Pedini-Angelini (born 15 July 1954) served as a Captain Regent of San Marino from 1 April 1981 to 1 October 1981. She served with Gastone Pasolini. She was the first female head of state of San Marino and, at age 26, one of the youngest. She later served as Director in the Ministry of Government and Foreign Affairs, and has been non-resident Ambassador in the Ministry to France, Denmark, Sweden, Norway and Hungary.

Honors 

  Order of Merit of the Italian Republic (Italy, 1998)
  Legion of Honour (France, 2004)

References

1954 births
20th-century women politicians
Ambassadors of San Marino to Denmark
Ambassadors of San Marino to France
Ambassadors of San Marino to Norway
Ambassadors of San Marino to Sweden
Captains Regent of San Marino
Sammarinese Christian Democratic Party politicians
Members of the Grand and General Council
Female heads of state
Living people
Sammarinese women in politics
Sammarinese women ambassadors
Sammarinese women diplomats